An unstable approach is an approach during which an aircraft does not maintain certain essential flight parameters within reasonable limits. This usually includes at least one of the following variables stable: speed, descent rate, vertical/lateral flight path and in landing configuration, or receive a landing clearance by a certain altitude. Unstabilized approaches account for most approach and landing accidents. Otherwise, a go-around should be executed by the pilot.

For example, the 2016 Magdalen Islands Mitsubishi MU-2 crash was blamed on an unstabilized approach.

References

External links
 Approach With Caution
 Flight Safety Foundation ALAR Briefing Note

Types of final approach (aviation)